The Seal of the City of Tampa is Tampa government's official seal. The seal was made in Italy in the 1920s by Val Antuono, Sr.

Design
In the center of the seal is a (historically inaccurate) depiction of the steamship Mascotte, which was owned by Henry B. Plant and was named after the operetta La mascotte by Edmond Audran. The ship (along with its sister ship Ollivette, which was also named for an opera by Audran) ran between Tampa, Key West, and Cuba from the mid-1880s until the early 1900s. It was in that capacity that it brought thousands of immigrants and regular shipments of clear Havana tobacco to Ybor City and West Tampa, helping to make Tampa the Cigar Capital of the World

The outside parameter of the city seal shows the "City of Tampa Florida" and "July 15, 1887", the date on which the city was organized under a special act of the Florida Legislature. The seal shown was created by Margaret Joan Hug, a city of Tampa employee. She created (updated) the seal in the late 1970s or early 1980s. Margaret was born on April 4, 1934, in Detroit, Michigan

See also
Flag of Tampa, Florida

References

External links
The Story of Tampa 

Official seals of places in Florida
Government of Tampa, Florida
Municipal heraldry of the United States
Coats of arms with ships